David O'Sullivan may refer to:

 David O'Sullivan (cricketer, born 1944), New Zealand cricketer
 David O'Sullivan (civil servant) (born 1953), Irish civil servant for the European Union
 David O'Sullivan (hurler) (born 1988), Irish hurler
 David O'Sullivan (cricketer, born 1997), Australian-born Welsh cricketer
 Dave O'Sullivan (horse trainer), New Zealand horse trainer
 David O'Sullivan (bowler), American ten-pin bowler
 David O'Sullivan, character in Black and White

See also
David Sullivan (disambiguation)